The Rewa River is a river of Guyana. It is a tributary of the Rupununi River.

See also
List of rivers of Guyana

References
 Rand McNally, The New International Atlas, 1993.

Rivers of Guyana